Roberto Cabrera (2 January 1914 – 7 October 1995) was a Chilean footballer. He played in eight matches for the Chile national football team from 1941 to 1942. He was also part of Chile's squad for the 1941 South American Championship.

References

External links
 

1914 births
1995 deaths
Chilean footballers
Chile international footballers
Place of birth missing
Association football defenders
Audax Italiano footballers